Debreceni Vadkakasok was a professional basketball team in Debrecen, Hungary. The team participated in the Korać Cup (1997 and 2002) twice and in the ULEB Cup once.

References

Basketball teams in Hungary
Basketball teams established in 1970
Sports clubs in Debrecen
1970 establishments in Hungary
2007 disestablishments in Hungary
Basketball teams disestablished in 2007